Équipe Fédérale Reims-Champagne was a French football club located in Reims, France.

History 
During World War II in 1943, new so-called Federal (EF) teams were created at the request of the Vichy France government. These brought together professional players from D1 clubs. ÉF Reims-Champagne made it to the 1944 Coupe de France Final, where they lost 4–0 to EF Nancy-Lorraine. The Federal teams were dismantled after that season, and professional clubs reinstated.

Colours and badge 
Reims-Champagne's kits were blue with a white stripe on the chest.

Honours
 Coupe de France
 Runners-up: 1943-44

References 

Defunct football clubs in France
1943 establishments in France
Association football clubs established in 1943
Association football clubs disestablished in 1944
1944 disestablishments in France
Sport in Reims
Football clubs in Grand Est